Samson Clement Whittaker (12 August 1888 – 19 September 1952) was an English professional football wing half who played in the Football League for Aston Villa.

Personal life 

Whittaker served as a pioneer in the Royal Engineers Inland Waterways and Docks during the latter months of the First World War.

Career statistics

References 

1888 births
Sportspeople from Walsall
English footballers
Aston Villa F.C. players
Royal Engineers soldiers
Association football wing halves
English Football League players
Association football inside forwards
British Army personnel of World War I
1952 deaths
Walsall F.C. wartime guest players